Kalanchoe rhombopilosa is a succulent plant species in the family Crassulaceae. This species of plant is endemic to southwest Itampolo, Madagascar. The species was described by Mannoni & Boiteau in 1947 and is indexed in Notul. Syst. (Paris) 13:153-154, (1947). The plant is a herbaceous perennial that grows to 10–20 cm in height.

References

 Boiteau, P & Allorge-Boiteau, L., Kalanchoe de Madagascar, 1995. Karthala.
 Eggli, U. (Ed.) 2003c. The Illustrated Handbook of Succulent Plants; Crassulaceae. Berlin: Springer-Verlag.
 Jacobsen, H. 1970 (Trans. Lois Glass 1977). Lexicon of Succulent Plants. Poole, Dorset: Blandford Press.
 Rauh, W., Xerophytic and Succulent Plants of Madagascar, Vols. 1 & 2, 1995 and 1998. Strawberry Press.
 Raven, P. et al. The Biology of Plants, W.H. Freeman and company. New York, 2005. p. 135.
 Sajeva, M. & Costanzo, M., Succulents - The Illustrated Dictionary, Timber Press.

rhombopilosa